The tug of war competition at the 2022 World Games took place in July 2022, in Birmingham in United States, at the University of Alabama Birmingham.
Originally scheduled to take place in July 2021, the Games were rescheduled for July 2022 as a result of the 2020 Summer Olympics postponement due to the COVID-19 pandemic.
 This was the first time when mixed event in tug of war took place as part of the World Games.

Participating nations

Medal table

Medalists

References

External links
 The World Games 2022
 Tug of War International Federation
 Results book

 World Games